Byron is the name of places in the U.S. state of Wisconsin:
Byron, Fond du Lac County, Wisconsin, a town
Byron (community), Fond du Lac County, Wisconsin, an unincorporated community
Byron, Monroe County, Wisconsin, a town
South Byron, Wisconsin, an unincorporated community

Railroad features
Byron Hill (railroad location)